Giorgio Calcaterra (Rome, 11 February 1972) is an Italian ultramarathoner, three times world champion of the 100 km. He is the most successful athlete at the IAU 100 km European Championships, being a three-time winner and also a silver and bronze medallist from 2008 to 2015.

In 2000 he ran 20 marathons under 2 hours and 20 minutes. He was the world leader of the 100 km top lists from 2008 to 2012. In 2003 he won the Helsinki City Marathon and in 2005 he won the Utrecht Marathon.

He is three time Italy winner of the Wings for Life World Run. In 2016 he was world winner of this race. He ran 88.44 km, the world record.

Calcaterra has been a vegetarian since the age of 15 and in 2019 became a vegan for ethical reasons.

Personal best
100 km: 6:23:20" (Seregno, 24 April 2012)
Wings for Life World Run: 88.44 km
Also Connemara International Ultra Marathon course record holder 63 km 3:56

Achievements

References

External links
 
 

1972 births
Living people
Athletes from Rome
Italian male long-distance runners
Italian male marathon runners
Italian ultramarathon runners
Male ultramarathon runners